The Lane Bane Bridge is a truss bridge that carries vehicular traffic across the Monongahela River between Brownsville, Pennsylvania and West Brownsville, Pennsylvania. The high level bridge was completed in November 1962 and was originally designed to be part of the Mon-Fayette Expressway. A  freeway segment stretches from the west bank of the bridge, and a final exit is contained directly on the eastern shore. The structure is designed not only to provide a river crossing without having to enter the associated deep valley, but it also carries vehicles high above the main streets of West Brownsville.

See also
 
 
 
 List of crossings of the Monongahela River

References

Bridges over the Monongahela River
Bridges completed in 1960
Bridges in Fayette County, Pennsylvania
Bridges in Washington County, Pennsylvania
Road bridges in Pennsylvania
U.S. Route 40
Bridges of the United States Numbered Highway System
Truss bridges in the United States
Metal bridges in the United States